The Poetics and Linguistics Association is an international academic association which exists to promote the research, teaching and learning in the study of linguistic style and the language of literature. The Poetics and Linguistics Association is usually known by the acronym PALA. The main activities of PALA are the publication of the journal Language and Literature, and an annual conference.

History 
PALA was founded in 1980 by a group of scholars who were interested in the language of literature, and who did not feel that the forums that were available to them at the time were adequate for productive academic discussion. Among the founding, or early, members were Ron Carter, Roger Fowler, Geoffrey Leech, Michael Short, Katie Wales, and Peter Verdonk.

To celebrate its Silver Jubilee in 2005, PALA held a poll of its members to award a prize to ‘the most influential book in stylistics’ to be published in its 25-year history. The prize was awarded to Style in Fiction by Geoffrey Leech and Mick Short, originally published by Longman in 1981, and a special symposium, hosted by the two authors, was held in Lancaster in March 2006.

Organisation 
PALA is run by a committee which is elected by the membership. An Annual General Meeting is held each year at the annual conference, and is the ultimate decision-making body of the association. The current chair is Marina Lambrou of Kingston University.

Former chairs of PALA are (most recent first):

 Michael Toolan
 Paul Simpson
 Michael Burke
 Lesley Jeffries
 Isil Bas
 Willie van Peer
 Tony Bex
 Katie Wales
 Mick Short
 Ron Carter
 Vimala Herman
 Roger Fowler

Journal 
Language and Literature is a peer-reviewed, international, academic journal covering the latest developments in stylistic analysis, the linguistic analysis of literature and related areas. Topics covered include: literary and non-literary stylistics, the connection between stylistics, critical theory, linguistics and literary criticism, and their applications in teaching to native and non-native speaking students. Language and Literature is published by Sage, and the current editor is Dan McIntyre, of the University of Huddersfield.

Annual conference 
PALA holds an annual conference each year.

Past conferences 
Meetings and conferences have been held since 1980. In recent years the major annual conference has taken place at the following venues:

 1995: University of Granada, Spain
 1996: Queen's University, Belfast
 1997: Nottingham (organised by University of Central England and Wolverhampton University)
 1998: Bern, Switzerland
 1999: Potchefstroom, South Africa
 2000: Goldsmiths College, London
 2001: Budapest, Hungary
 2002: University of Birmingham, UK
 2003: Bogazici University, Istanbul
 2004: New York University
 2005: Huddersfield University, UK
 2006: Joensuu, Finland
 2007: Kansai Gaidai University, Japan
 2008: University of Sheffield
 2009: Roosevelt Academy, Middelburg, the Netherlands
 2010: Genova, Italy.
 2011: University of Namibia
 2012: University of Malta
2013: University of Heidelberg
2014: University of Maribor
2015: University of Kent
2016: Universita di Cagliari
2017: West Chester University
2018: University of Birmingham
2019: University of Liverpool
2020: University of Nottingham (online)

Future conferences
 2021: Aix-Marseille Université
 2022: Sheffield Hallam University

References

Further reading 
 Wales, Katie and Mick Short. 2003. "The Poetics and Linguistics Association (PALA)". Diogenes 50 (2): 139-141.

External links 
 
 Language and Literature
 Style in Fiction Symposium

Linguistic societies
Poetry organizations
Organizations established in 1980